is a Japanese politician of the New Komeito Party, a member of the House of Representatives in the Diet (national legislature). A native of Nagoya, Aichi, he attended Osaka University as both undergraduate and graduate students. After working at JR Central from 1994 to 2005, he was elected to the House of Representatives for the first time in 2005.

References

External links 
  in Japanese.

1969 births
Living people
People from Nagoya
Members of the House of Representatives (Japan)
New Komeito politicians
Osaka University alumni
21st-century Japanese politicians